The office of High Sheriff of Cardiganshire was established in 1541, since when a high sheriff was appointed annually until 1974 when the office was transformed into that of High Sheriff of Dyfed as part of the creation of Dyfed from the amalgamation of Cardiganshire, Carmarthenshire and Pembrokeshire. Between the Edwardian Conquest of Wales in 1282 and the establishment of the High Sheriff of Cardiganshire, the sheriff's duties were mainly the responsibility of the coroner and the Custos Rotulorum of Cardiganshire. The office of High Sheriff remained first in precedence in the county until the reign of Edward VII when an Order in Council in 1908 gave the Lord Lieutenant of Cardiganshire the prime office under the Crown as the sovereign's personal representative.

List of Sheriffs

1435: William ap Thomas

16th century

17th century

18th century

19th century

20th century

See also
 High Sheriff of Dyfed

References

 
History of Ceredigion
Cardiganshire